Civic Center/UN Plaza station (often Civic Center station) is a combined BART and Muni Metro rapid transit station in the Market Street Subway in downtown San Francisco. Located under Market Street between 7th Street and 8th Street, it is named for the Civic Center neighborhood and the adjacent United Nations Plaza. The three-level station has a large fare mezzanine level, with separate platform levels for Muni Metro and BART below.

History 
BART service at the station began on November 5, 1973, followed by Muni Metro service on February 18, 1980.

In 2005, the station name was changed to Civic Center/UN Plaza during celebrations for the 60th anniversary of the United Nations and World Environment Day. Additional fares gates to allow direction connections between Muni and BART (without having to go up to the fare mezzanine) were also proposed.

Construction of a bike station on the mezzanine level began in December 2014; it opened in August 2015.

The entrances on the southern side of the station were closed from April 13, 2020, to June 12, 2021, due to low ridership during the COVID-19 pandemic.

Station layout and changes 

Like the three other shared Muni/BART stations in the Market Street Subway, Civic Center has three underground levels. The first level is a fare mezzanine, with two Muni paid areas and two BART paid areas. The second level has a single island platform for Muni Metro, and the third level has an island platform for BART. The station has six street entrances along its length.

A passageway formerly led to two additional entrances west of 8th Street and Hyde Street. One – on the north side of Market Street at Grove Street – was temporarily closed in December 2016 after a sewer pipe collapsed under the escalators. The entrance remained closed until it was permanently removed in October 2017. The remaining entrance west of 8th Street was permanently closed on November 1, 2018, as the passageway space was needed for a new electrical substation to add redundancy and capacity to support increased Transbay Tube train frequency. The six original entrances (all of which are significantly closer to the faregates) remained open.

Following the 2015 addition of a canopy over an escalator at 19th Street Oakland station, which reduced escalator downtime by one-third, BART decided to add canopies to all downtown Oakland and San Francisco entrances. The canopies will protect the escalator from weather damage, improve lighting, allow the escalator to be fully closed off when the station is not open, and provide a location for real-time train arrival information displays. The Civic Center station entrance at Market and 7th was chosen for early implementation; it was closed on December 11, 2017, with the new canopy opened on October 9, 2018. The southern entrance at Market and 8th was closed on May 9, 2022, for canopy installation, with reopening expected that November. All canopies are planned to be complete by 2027.

In May 2018, BART proposed to close off a corridor that connects the 7th Street and 8th Street sides of the station because it was frequently used for drug use. In February 2020, BART began a 12-month project to add two additional staircases to the BART platform. BART plans to add a faregate on the platform for the elevator in 2022.

Connections 

Two Muni heritage streetcar stops are located above the station: Market and 7th Street, and Market and 8th Street (inbound) / Market and Hyde (outbound). Both are served by the F Market and Wharves line. The station is also served by a number of Muni bus and trolleybus routes:
Rapid: , 
Express: 

Several Golden Gate Transit routes (24C, 30, 54C, 70, 92, 101, 101X) stop on 7th Street adjacent to the station. Additional Muni and SamTrans (FCXX, 292, 397, 398) bus routes run on Mission Street, one block away. AC Transit serves Civic Center station with the 800 All Nighter route during hours that BART is not operating.

Under the planned Better Market Street project, stops on the F Market and Wharves line and bus routes would be consolidated to reduce travel times. The F stops at 7th and 8th streets would be replaced by a single midblock stop.

References

External links 

BART: Civic Center / UN Plaza Station
SFMTA: Civic Center Station inbound, outbound
SF Bay Transit (unofficial): MUNI Metro Civic Center Station, Civic Center/UN Plaza BART Station

Bay Area Rapid Transit stations in San Francisco
Stations on the Yellow Line (BART)
Stations on the Green Line (BART)
Stations on the Red Line (BART)
Stations on the Blue Line (BART)
Muni Metro stations
Civic Center, San Francisco
Market Street (San Francisco)
Railway stations in the United States opened in 1973
Railway stations located underground in California